Out the Gate may refer to:

 Out the Gate (album), a 2006 album by Termanology and DC the Midi Alien
 Out the Gate (film), a 2011 Jamaican action film